The 1998 Heineken Trophy was a tennis tournament played on grass courts in Rosmalen, 's-Hertogenbosch in the Netherlands that was part of the International Series of the 1998 ATP Tour and of Tier III of the 1998 WTA Tour. The tournament was held from 15 June through 21 June 1998. Patrick Rafter and Julie Halard-Decugis won the singles titles.

Finals

Men's singles

 Patrick Rafter defeated  Martin Damm 7–6(7–2), 6–2
 It was Rafter's 3rd title of the year and the 10th of his career.

Women's singles

 Julie Halard-Decugis defeated  Miriam Oremans 6–3, 6–4
 It was Halard-Decugis' 2nd title of the year and the 11th of her career.

Men's doubles

 Guillaume Raoux /  Jan Siemerink defeated  Joshua Eagle /  Andrew Florent 7–6(7–5), 6–2
 It was Raoux's only title of the year and the 5th of his career. It was Siemerink's 2nd title of the year and the 12th of his career.

Women's doubles

 Sabine Appelmans /  Miriam Oremans defeated  Cătălina Cristea /  Eva Melicharová 6–7(4–7), 7–6(8–6), 7–6(7–5)
 It was Appelmans' 2nd title of the year and the 10th of her career. It was Oremans' 2nd title of the year and the 3rd of her career.

References

External links
 ATP Tournament Profile
 WTA Tournament Profile
 ITF – Tournament Details
 

Heineken Trophy
Heineken Trophy
Rosmalen Grass Court Championships
1998 in Dutch tennis